Arthur Eugene Baggs (27 October 1886, New York City – 15 February 1947, Columbus) was an American chemist and potter.

He studied under Charles Fergus Binns at Alfred University. In 1904-05 he established Marblehead Pottery in Marblehead, Massachusetts, and designed vessels there until it closed in 1936. Meanwhile, he worked as a glaze chemist at Cowan Pottery from 1925 to 1928. From 1928 on he taught ceramics at Ohio State University.

Baggs' work is characterized by simple forms and muted, earthen colors. He is especially noted for his salt-glaze stoneware.

Further reading 
 Denker, Ellen Paul.  "Baggs, Arthur Eugene." In Grove Art Online. Oxford Art Online, (accessed February 5, 2012; subscription required).

External links 
 Work by Arthur Eugene Baggs in the collection of the Museum of Arts and Design
 Detailed biography of Arthur Eugene Baggs on the website of Marblehead Pottery
 Arthur Eugene Baggs on Artnet
 Arthur E. Baggs Memorial Library at Ohio State University

1886 births
1947 deaths
American potters
American ceramists
20th-century American chemists
Ohio State University faculty
20th-century ceramists